The following is a partial discography of the many audio and video recordings of Giuseppe Verdi's opera, La traviata. Based on the 1848 novel La dame aux Camélias by Alexandre Dumas, fils, La traviata has been a staple of the operatic repertoire since its premiere on 6 March 1853 at the Teatro La Fenice in Venice.

Audio recordings

Video recordings

References
Notes

Cited sources
La traviata discography, part 1 (40 items), part 2 (7 items), Amazon.com
 Recorded Violettas in La traviata

Other sources
Blyth, Alan, Opera on Record, Volume 1, Hutchinson, 1979, pp. 240–248. 
Boyden, Matthew and Kimberly, Nick, "La Traviata: Recordings overview, The Rough Guide to Opera, Rough Guides, 2002, pp. 230–231. 
Fawkes, Richard, Opera on Film, Duckworth, 2000. 
McCants, Clyde T., American Opera Singers and Their Recordings: Critical commentaries and discographies, McFarland, 2004. 
Rich, Alan, "A Triumphant Traviata: The Lisbon Legacy", New York, 8 December 1980, p. 100.

Opera discographies
Operas by Giuseppe Verdi